August Wilhelm Bach (4 October 1796 – 15 April 1869) was a German composer and organist. He is unrelated to the family of Johann Sebastian Bach. He studied with his father, Gottfried, as well as with Carl Friedrich Zelter and Ludwig Berger as well as at the Berlin Singing Academy. In 1816 he served as an organist at St Mary's Church and from 1820 he taught organ and music theory at the Institute of Church Music set up by Zelter. In 1832, Bach succeeded Zelter as the director of the Royal Institute of Church Music in Berlin. He also taught at the Prussian Academy of Arts. His compositions largely consist of sacred works and works for keyboard. He also wrote a pipe organ method and a hymnbook.

External links
 

1796 births
1869 deaths
German Romantic composers
German classical organists
German male organists
19th-century classical composers
German male classical composers
19th-century German composers
19th-century German male musicians
Male classical organists
19th-century organists